The Nederlandse Handbal Eredivisie is the top Dutch professional handball league. The winners of the Eredivisie are recognised as the Dutch handball champions.

Competition Format 

In the first phase of the season, the top 6 teams of the previous season participate in the BENE-League competition. They are joined by the top 6 teams from Belgium. At the same time, the remaining 12 teams, participate in a national competition. In the second phase, the 4 best ranking Dutch teams of the BENE-League, who automatically qualified for next season's BENE-League, compete in a 2-round system for the national title. The first round is a full competition among those 4. In the second round the 2 teams which ended on top, decide in a best-of-three who wins the title. In the final ranking, these teams end up on ranks 1 to 4. The 2 lowest ranking Dutch teams of the BENE-League, together with the 2 best ranking teams of the national competition, compete in full competition, for 2 spots in next season's BENE-League. In the final ranking, these teams end up on ranks 5 to 8. The teams which ended 3 to 10 in the national competition play a 3-round system to decide their final ranking (ranks 9 to 16). Something like a knock-out system with the major difference that losing a match doesn't mean you get eliminated but you continue for the lower ranks, where winning means you continue for the better ranks. So the teams winning in the first round continue for the final ranks 9 to 12 and those losing for the ranks 13 to 16. The same principle is repeated in the second round and final ranks are decided in the third round. Last but not least, the 2 teams who ended at the bottom of the national competition, together with 4-period winners of the Eerste Divisie compete in a 2-round system for 1 spot in next season's Eredivisie. In the first round, the 6 teams are split into 2 groups of 3 in such a way that the 2 Eredivisie teams are never in the same group. In each group, the 3 teams play a full competition. The winners of both groups decide in a best-of-two who plays next season in the Eredivisie. The final spot in the Eredivisie is taken by the champions of the Eerste Divisie.

2020–21 season 
The following 16 clubs compete in the Eredivisie during the 2020–21 season.

Eredivisie previous champions

 1954 : Aalsmeer
 1955 : PSV Handbal
 1956 : Olympia Hengelo
 1957 : Olympia Hengelo (2)
 1958 : Olympia Hengelo (3)
 1959: Aalsmeer (2)
 1960 : NILOC Amsterdam
 1961 : NILOC Amsterdam (2)
 1962 : Operatie '55
 1963 : Operatie '55 (2)
 1964 : Operatie '55 (3)
 1965 : Operatie '55 (4)
 1966 : Sittardia
 1967 : ESCA Arnhem
 1968 : Sittardia (2)
 1969 : Sittardia (3)
 1970 : Sittardia (4)
 1971 : Sittardia (5)
 1972 : Sittardia (6)
 1973 : Sittardia (7)
 1974 : Sittardia (8)
 1975 : Sittardia (9)
 1976 : Sittardia (10)
 1977 : Sittardia (11)
 1978 : Duyvestein/Hermes
 1979 : Sittardia (12)
 1980 : NCR/Blauw-Wit
 1981 : NCR/Blauw-Wit (2)
 1982 : Vlug en Lenig
 1983 : Vlug en Lenig (2)
 1984 : Vlug en Lenig (3)
 1985 : Aalsmeer (3)
 1986 : Herschi/V&L (4)
 1987 : Sittardia (13)
 1988 : NCR/Blauw-Wit (3)
 1989 : HAKA/E&O
 1990 : VGZ/Sittardia (14)
 1991 : HAKA/E&O (2)
 1992 : HAKA/E&O (3)
 1993 : VGZ/Sittardia (15)
 1994 : VGZ/Sittardia (16)
 1995 : Thrifty/Aalsmeer (4)
 1996 : ANOVA/E&O (4)
 1997 : Horn/Sittardia (17)
 1998 : ANOVA/E&O (5)
 1999 : Horn/Sittardia (18)
 2000 : ShowBizCity/Aalsmeer (5)
 2001 : ShowBizCity/Aalsmeer (6)
 2002 : Wealer/V&L (5)
 2003 : FIQAS/Aalsmeer (7)
 2004 : FIQAS/Aalsmeer (8)
 2005 : KRAS/Volendam
 2006 : KRAS/Volendam (2)
 2007 : KRAS/Volendam (3)
 2008 : Hellas Den Haag
 2009 : FIQAS/Aalsmeer (9)
 2010 : KRAS/Volendam (4)
 2011 : KRAS/Volendam (5) 
 2012 : KRAS/Volendam (6)
 2013 : KRAS/Volendam (7) 
 2014 : Eurotech/Bevo HC 
 2015 : OCI-LIONS
 2016 : OCI-LIONS (2)
 2017 : OCI-LIONS (3)
 2018 : FIQAS/Aalsmeer (10)
 2019 : Green Park/Aalsmeer (11)
 2020 : No champion
 2021: Green Park/Aalsmeer (12)
 2022: Green Park/Aalsmeer (13)

EHF coefficient ranking
For season 2017/2018, see footnote

24.  (23)  Eerste Nationele
25.  (28)  Sales Lentz League
26.  (32)  Eredivisie
27.  (26)  Extraliga
28.  (22)  Handball Premier

References

External links
 Official website

Netherlands
Handball in the Netherlands
Professional sports leagues in the Netherlands